Jaoon Kahan Bata Ae Dil or Lovefucked is an Indian Hindi-language romantic drama film directed by Aadish Keluskar.

Cast 
 Khushboo Upadhyay
 Rohit Kokate
 Himanshu Kohli

Release
It was released on August 9, 2019 on Netflix streaming.

Reception

Critical response
Udita Jhunjhunwala of Firstpost gave the film 3 out of 5 stars stating that the lead actors threw themselves into their parts in a film that is an absorbing take on modern-day love with Mumbai at its center. Sankhyan Ghosh writing for Film Companion also gives the film 3 stars out of 5 calling it a provocative anti-romance set in Mumbai.

References

External links 
 

2010s Hindi-language films
Indian drama films
Hindi-language Netflix original films
2018 films
Hindi-language drama films
Indian direct-to-video films
2018 direct-to-video films
2018 drama films